Players and pairs who neither have high enough rankings nor receive wild cards may participate in a qualifying tournament held one week before the annual Wimbledon Tennis Championships.

Seeds

  Marie-Christine Calleja (second round)
  Kim Sands (second round)
  Nathalie Tauziat (second round)
  Lea Plchová (qualifying competition, lucky loser)
  Nathalie Herreman (second round)
  Kris Kinney (qualifying competition, lucky loser)
  Jennifer Mundel (second round)
  Kim Steinmetz (first round)
  Maeve Quinlan (first round)
  Andrea Betzner (qualified)
  Csilla Bartos (second round, retired)
  Patty Fendick (qualified)
  Linda Howell (qualifying competition)
  Jamie Golder (second round)
  Hu Na (qualified)
  Barbara Jordan (qualified)

Qualifiers

  Barbara Jordan
  Molly Van Nostrand
  Elna Reinach
  Jenny Byrne
  Patty Fendick
  Hu Na
  Andrea Betzner
  Elisabeth Ekblom

Lucky losers

  Lea Plchová
  Kris Kinney

Qualifying draw

First qualifier

Second qualifier

Third qualifier

Fourth qualifier

Fifth qualifier

Sixth qualifier

Seventh qualifier

Eighth qualifier

External links

1985 Wimbledon Championships on WTAtennis.com
1985 Wimbledon Championships – Women's draws and results at the International Tennis Federation

Women's Singles Qualifying
Wimbledon Championship by year – Women's singles qualifying
Wimbledon Championships